Bhajpura is a village and gram panchayat in Salarpur block, Budaun district, Uttar Pradesh, India. Its village code is 128326. According to 2011 Census of India, the total population of the village is 460 out of 233 are males and 227 are females.

References

Villages in Budaun district